The 2007 Coppa Italia Final was the final of the 2006–07 Coppa Italia, the 60th season of the top cup competition in Italian football. The match was played over two legs between Roma and Internazionale. The first leg was played in Rome on 9 May 2007, while the second leg was held on 17 May. Roma won the trophy with an aggregate result of 7–4. This was the third final between the clubs, all played in consecutive years, the two having previously met in the 2005 and 2006 finals. Roma were playing in the final for the 14th time, while Inter were competing in their 10th final.

First leg

Second leg

See also
 2006–07 Coppa Italia

References

Coppa Italia Final 2007
Coppa Italia Finals
Coppa Italia Final 2007
Coppa Italia Final 2007
Coppa Italia Final